The Thomas A. Scott Fellowship in Hygiene was a competitive academic grant made at the University of Pennsylvania for the study of scientific hygiene and sanitary science, the precursors of the modern science of pathology.  It was established in 1892 in the name of late railroad executive and financier Thomas Alexander Scott by his widow.

Recipients
Mazÿck Porcher Ravenel, 1893
Fellowship vacant 1899
John Jeremiah Wenner, 1915

See also
Thomas A. Scott Professorship of Mathematics

References 

Pathology
Awards established in 1892
University of Pennsylvania
Scholarships in the United States